The football tournament at the 1979 Southeast Asian Games was held from 22 to 30 September in Jakarta, Indonesia.

Teams 
Brunei and the Philippines did not enter.  Kampuchea (then name for Cambodia), Laos and Vietnam did not participate at the Southeast Asian Games.

Tournament 
The competition was played in a group format with the five participating teams; first and second place would then play off for the gold medal.

Group stage

Second place play-off 
As Indonesia and Thailand were level on points and goals, a play-off for second place (and the right to face Malaysia in the gold medal match) was required.

Gold medal match

Winners

Medal winners

References 
Southeast Asian Games 1979 at RSSSF
SEA Games 1979 at AFF official website

Sou
Football at the Southeast Asian Games
International association football competitions hosted by Indonesia
South